Dragan Vuković (born August 26, 1963) is a Serbian basketball coach. He currently serves as a head coach for the Crvena zvezda of the Women's Basketball League of Serbia and the Women's Adriatic League.

Coaching career

Men's basketball 
Vuković started his coaching career in hometown team Iva Zorka in 1991. In the first years he was a coach for youth selections. Later he became a head coach for senior team. After 1997–98 season he left. Also, he had second stint with Iva Zorka during 2001–02 season.

Women's basketball 
Vuković was a heah coach for Mačva Šabac, Vojvodina, Jedinstvo Bijelo Polje, Partizan and Radivoj Korać.

Crvena zvezda (2013–present) 
In 2013, Vuković became a head coach for Crvena zvezda. He won the national cup in the 2016 tournament. In the 2016–17 season, Vuković won Serbian League, the first time in 13 years. Also, he won the national cup with Zvezda in the same season.

In March 2021, Vuković coached the Zvezda on his 300th game.

Career achievements
 Serbian League: 5 (with Crvena zvezda: 2016–17, 2017–18, 2018–19, 2020–21, 2021–22)
 Serbian Cup: 4 (with Crvena zvezda: 2015–16, 2016–17, 2018–19, 2021–22)

References

External links
 Coach Profile at eurobasket.com

1963 births
Living people
Serbian men's basketball coaches
OKK Šabac coaches
Serbian expatriate basketball people in Montenegro
Sportspeople from Šabac
ŽKK Crvena zvezda coaches
ŽKK Partizan coaches